The 2015 Inter-Provincial Championship is the third season of the Inter-Provincial Championship, the domestic three-day (though not officially first-class) cricket competition of Ireland. The competition is played between Leinster Lightning, Northern Knights and North West Warriors.

Standings

Squads

Fixtures

External links

See also
2015 Inter-Provincial Cup
2015 Inter-Provincial Trophy

Inter-Provincial Championship seasons
Inter